Nathan George (July 27, 1936 – March 3, 2017) was an American actor who was active from 1968 to 1997. He co-won a 1969 Obie Award with Ron O'Neal for Charles Gordone's Pulitzer Prize-winning play No Place to Be Somebody; this performance also received a Drama Desk Award.

George also directed for the stage. He directed a production of Ron Milner's Who's Got His Own at Center Stage in Baltimore in 1970, and Cummings and Bowings, a play based on poems by E.E. Cummings, for the U.R.G.E.N.T. Theatre in New York in 1973.

In film, George acted in Brubaker (1980), Klute (1971), Serpico (1973), Harsh Light (1997), his last film, and One Flew Over the Cuckoo's Nest (1975) and was one of the leads in Short Eyes (1977).

George died on March 3, 2017, in New York City.

Filmography

References

External links

Interview at CultFilmFreaks.com

African-American male actors
American male film actors
Drama Desk Award winners
Obie Award recipients
American male stage actors
2017 deaths
1936 births
20th-century African-American people
21st-century African-American people